Momen Mahran (born 20 August 1996) is an Egyptian canoeist. He competed in the men's K-1 200 metres event at the 2020 Summer Olympics.

References

External links
 

1996 births
Living people
Egyptian male canoeists
Olympic canoeists of Egypt
Canoeists at the 2020 Summer Olympics
Place of birth missing (living people)
African Games medalists in canoeing
Competitors at the 2019 African Games
African Games silver medalists for Egypt
21st-century Egyptian people
20th-century Egyptian people